Kateřina Mrázová (born 9 July 1972 in Brno) is a Czech retired competitive ice dancer. With partner Martin Šimeček, she is a multiple Czech national champion. They placed 10th at the 1992 Winter Olympics (at which they competed for Czechoslovakia), 8th at the 1994 Winter Olympics, and 13th at the 1998 Winter Olympics. They retired from competitive skating following the 1998 World Figure Skating Championships.

Results
(ice dance with Martin Šimeček)

References

 Skatabase: 1990s Ice Dancing Olympics Results

External links
 Figure skating corner profile

Czech female ice dancers
Czechoslovak female ice dancers
Figure skaters at the 1992 Winter Olympics
Figure skaters at the 1994 Winter Olympics
Figure skaters at the 1998 Winter Olympics
Olympic figure skaters of the Czech Republic
Olympic figure skaters of Czechoslovakia
Universiade medalists in figure skating
Figure skaters from Brno
1972 births
Living people
Universiade gold medalists for the Czech Republic
Universiade silver medalists for the Czech Republic
Competitors at the 1993 Winter Universiade
Competitors at the 1995 Winter Universiade